Cyril Chamberlain (8 March 1909 – 5 December 1974) was an English film and television actor. He appeared in a number of the early Carry On, Doctor and St. Trinian's films.

Chamberlain was born on 8 March 1909 in London and died in Builth Wells in Wales on 5 December 1974 aged 65. He spent his final five years in retirement restoring antique furniture.

He was married to actress Lisa Lee and they had one child.

He appeared in 139 films between 1938 and 1966.

His first film appearance was in the 1939 Will Hay comedy film Ask a Policeman; his role was uncredited. His film roles were often quite small. However, he did have notable parts, with third and fourth billing respectively, as the main villain in both the crime drama The Embezzler (1954) and the crime thriller Tiger by the Tail (1954).

Partial filmography

Crackerjack (1938) as Bit Role (uncredited)
Stolen Life (1939) (uncredited)
Dead Men are Dangerous (1939) as George Franklin (uncredited) 
The Spy in Black (1939) as Bit Part (uncredited)
Ask a Policeman (1939) as Radio Announcer (uncredited)
This Man in Paris (1939) as Swindon
Poison Pen (1939) as Peter Cashelton
What Would You Do, Chums? (1939) as Mike Collins
The Body Vanished (1939) as Auctioneer 
Return to Yesterday (1940) as Bit Part (uncredited)
Jailbirds (1940) as Bob
Old Mother Riley in Society (1940)
Spare a Copper (1940) as Policeman (uncredited)
Old Mother Riley in Business (1941) as John Halliwell
Crook's Tour (1941) as American (uncredited)
He Found a Star (1941) as Louie
The Common Touch (1941) as Jenkins (uncredited)
The Black Sheep of Whitehall (1942) as BBC Producer (uncredited)
The Big Blockade (1942) as Press 
The Man Within (1947) as Runner, Court clark
The Upturned Glass (1947) as Junior Doctor
Dancing with Crime (1947) as Sniffy
Brighton Rock (1947) as Detective (uncredited)
Night Beat (1947) as PC Rix (uncredited)
The Calendar (1948) as Customs Official
My Brother's Keeper (1948) as Archer (uncredited)
London Belongs to Me (1948) as Detective Sergeant Wilson
The Blind Goddess (1948) as Policeman in Park
Quartet (1948) as Reporter (segment "The Kite")
Here Come the Huggetts (1948) as Policeman at Crash Site (uncredited)
Once a Jolly Swagman (1949) as Reporter
Portrait from Life (1949) as Supervisor
It's Not Cricket (1949) as MP No. 2
The Bad Lord Byron (1949) as Defending Counsel
The Huggetts Abroad (1949) as Hopkinson (uncredited) 
A Boy, a Girl and a Bike (1949) as Bert Gardner
Stop Press Girl (1949) as Johnnie
Marry Me (1949) as P.C. Jackson
Whisky Galore! (1949) as Bit Part (uncredited)
Don't Ever Leave Me (1949) as News Reporter
Helter Skelter (1949) as Bit Part (uncredited)
The Chiltern Hundreds (1949) as Sentry
Boys in Brown (1949) as Mr. Johnson
Stage Fright (1950) as Detective Sgt. Loomis (uncredited)
Tony Draws a Horse (1950) as Minor Role (uncredited)
Waterfront (1950) as Reporter (uncredited)
The Clouded Yellow (1950) as Passport Official (uncredited)
Blackmailed (1951) as Police Constable
The Adventures (1951) as Waiter
Scarlet Thread (1951) as Mason
The Lavender Hill Mob (1951) as Commander
Lady Godiva Rides Again (1951) as Harry
Old Mother Riley's Jungle Treasure (1952) as Capt. Daincourt
Sing Along with Me (1952) as Jack Bates
Escape Route (1952) as Bailey (uncredited)
Folly to Be Wise (1953) as Drill Sergeant
The Net (1953) as Insp. Carter
Deadly Nightshade (1953) as Bit Part (uncredited)
Innocents in Paris (1953) as Bit Part (uncredited)
A Day to Remember (1953) as Boarding Card Official on Ferry (uncredited)
Trouble in Store (1953) as Alf
Impulse (1954) as Gray
Hell Below Zero (1954) as Factory Ship Radio Operator
You Know What Sailors Are (1954) as Stores Officer
Doctor in the House (1954) as Policeman
The Diamond (1954) as Castle
Forbidden Cargo (1954) as Customs Officer (uncredited)
The Embezzler (1954) as Alec Johnson
Companions in Crime (1954)
Up to His Neck (1955) as Walter (uncredited)
Raising a Riot (1955) as Policeman (uncredited)
Above Us the Waves (1955) as CPO Chubb
Doctor at Sea (1955) as Whimble
Value for Money (1955) as Hotel Manager (uncredited)
Tiger by the Tail (1955) as C.A. Foster
Simon and Laura (1955) as Bert
Man of the Moment (1955) as British Delegate
Dial 999 (1955) as Anderson (murder victim)
An Alligator Named Daisy (1955) as Party Guest (uncredited)
Windfall (1955) as Clarkson
The Gamma People (1956) as Graf
Lost (1956) as Uniformed Police Officer (uncredited)
Private's Progress (1956) as Bit Part (uncredited)
The Iron Petticoat (1956) as Hotel Doorman (uncredited)
Eyewitness (1956) as Cinema Patron (uncredited)
The Green Man (1956) as Sergeant Bassett
Up in the World (1957) as Harper
Doctor at Large (1957) as Police Constable (uncredited)
The Tommy Steele Story (1957) as Chief Steward
The Prince and the Showgirl (1957) as Bit Part (uncredited)
Miracle in Soho (1957) as Policeman (uncredited)
No Time for Tears (1957) as Hall Porter
After the Ball (1957) as Villiers
Just My Luck (1957) as Goodwood Official
The One That Got Away (1957) as Sergeant 'Later' (uncredited)
Blue Murder at St Trinian's (1957) as Captain
The Man Who Wouldn't Talk (1958) as Liftman (uncredited)
Innocent Sinners (1958) as Col. Francis Baldock (uncredited)
The Duke Wore Jeans (1958) as Barman
Wonderful Things! (1958) as Butler 
The Big Money (1958) as Detective at Hotel (uncredited)
A Night to Remember (1958) as Quartermaster George Thomas Rowe
Man with a Gun (1958) as Supt. Wood
Carry On Sergeant (1958) as Gun Sergeant
Chain of Events (1958) as Bus Conductor
The Heart of a Man (1959) as Boxing MC (uncredited)
Too Many Crooks (1959) as Chief Fire Officer (uncredited)
Carry On Nurse (1959) as Bert Able
Operation Bullshine (1959) as Orderly Sergeant
The Ugly Duckling (1959) as Police Sergeant
Carry On Teacher (1959) as Alf Hudson
Upstairs and Downstairs (1959) as Guard
Please Turn Over (1959) as Mr. Jones
Two-Way Stretch (1960) as Gate Warder (Day)
Carry On Constable (1960) as Thurston
Doctor in Love (1960) as Bit Part (uncredited)
The Bulldog Breed (1960) as Jimmy the Landlord (uncredited) 
The Pure Hell of St Trinian's (1960) as Army Captain
No Kidding (1961) as Cafe proprietor
Carry On Regardless (1961) as Policeman
Nearly a Nasty Accident (1961) as Warr. Off. Breech
Dentist on the Job (1961) as Director
Flame in the Streets (1961) as Dowell
Raising the Wind (1961) as L.A.M.A. Porter
A Pair of Briefs (1962) as Policeman (uncredited)
Carry On Cruising (1962) as Tom Tree, Steward
The Iron Maiden (1962) as Mrs. Webb's teammate
On the Beat (1962) as Cafe Proprietor (uncredited)
The Human Jungle (20 April 1963,10:05 pm):ABC T.V.: Uncredited car polisher:'Thin Ice' Episode
Two Left Feet (1963) as Miles
Carry On Cabby (1963) as Sarge
A Stitch in Time (1963) as Bit Part (uncredited)
Ring of Spies (1964) as Anderson
Joey Boy (1965) as Lt. James Ridley (uncredited)
Sky West and Crooked (1966) as Hubberd
The Great St Trinian's Train Robbery (1966) as Maxie
The Yellow Hat (1966) as Bit Part (uncredited) (final film role)

References

External links

1909 births
1974 deaths
English male film actors
20th-century English male actors
Male actors from London